The Voicenotes Tour was the third concert tour by American singer Charlie Puth, in support of his second studio album Voicenotes (2018). The tour began in Toronto, Canada at the Budweiser Stage on July 11, 2018, and concluded in Tokyo, Japan at the Tokyo International Forum on November 22, 2018.

Background 
On December 18, 2017, Puth announced his first major headlining tour after opening for Shawn Mendes on his Illuminate World Tour. Hailee Steinfeld was announced as the opening act. The tour dates were announced and set to take place in 32 different cities in North America.

On June 27, 2018, several dates were announced for Asia where the tour would be produced by Live Nation Asia.

Critical reception 

The tour received positive reviews. Taylor Weatherby from Billboard praised the stage setup, writing that “the angled backdrop includes two massive screens that flash between Charlie, mesmerizing light shows and crowd shots, making the otherwise pretty simple staging feel vast”, in addition to noting the “quirky commentary” between performances, 
Puth's “dad moves” during performances, and his “inspiring level of confidence” while shirtless. Bobby Olivier from NJ.com, described Puth as having “a severe case of pop star personality disorder”, praised Puth's use of a keytar as him having “played the hell out of an instrument in which no pop artist has seriously dabbled for the last five presidential administrations,” in addition to writing that “the deafening response to every close-up camera shot of the star’s face or body wasn’t far from how diehards manically cheer for his slightly more famous constituents Justin Bieber, Shawn Mendes and Harry Styles”. David Peng, from Young Post of South China Morning Post, praised Puth's vocals, describing them as “sweet and soft” with “his sound so clear it rivaled the studio-recorded version”.

Set list 
This set list is from the show in Toronto on July 11, 2018, and is not intended to represent all concerts for the tour.

 "The Way I Am"
 "Slow It Down"
 "How Long"
 "Empty Cups"
 "LA Girls"
 "Marvin Gaye"
 "Patient"
 "Change"
 "We Don't Talk Anymore"
 "Somebody Told Me"
 "Done for Me"
 "Suffer"
 "One Call Away"
 "Attention"

Encore
"BOY"
"See You Again"

Tour dates

Cancelled shows

Notes

References 

2018 concert tours